Ravvivando is the 8th album by the German krautrock group Faust, released in 1999. A vinyl edition (one 12" and one 10") was released about a year later including a bonus track not included on the CD edition.

Background
Founding member Jean-Hervé Péron left the band prior to the recording of the album due to "artistic differences". The band recruited guitarist Steven Lobdell and bassist Michael Stoll alongside the returning members, drummer Werner "Zappi" Diermaier, and keyboardist Hans Joachim Irmler. The album is mostly instrumental, while the "few lyrics are incomprehensible, buried and/or in German."

Reception
Jason Gross of Allmusic called the album "some of the best Velvet Underground minimalist-noise-rush this side of My Bloody Valentine" and calling it an "intriguing phase for an always unpredictable group." Q compared the album to the groups earlier Musique concrète work, "Namely huge bedrocks of looping, mutated riffing, driven by metronomic [drums] and glued by [keyboards].

Track listing
 "Ein Neuer Tag" – 4:16	
 "Carousel II" – 2:45	
 "Wir Brauchen Dich #6" – 7:22	
 "Four Plus Seven Means Eleven" – 7:07	
 "Take Care" – 4:08	
 "Spiel" – 0:41	
 "Dr' Hansl" – 1:30	
 "Apokalypse" – 4:30	
 "D.I.G." – 5:29	
 "Du Weißt Schon" – 2:43	
 "Livin' Tokyo" – 8:43	
 "T-Électronique" – 6:51

Personnel

Werner "Zappi" Diermaier- drums
Ulrike Helmholtz - vocals
Hans Joachim Irmler - keyboards, organ
Steven Wray Lobdell - guitar
Michael Stoll - bass guitar
Lars Paukstat - percussion

References

External links
Ravvivando at faust-pages.com.

1999 albums
Faust (band) albums